Charles Mayer (21 March 1799 – 2 July 1862), also known as Carl Mayer or Charles Meyer, was a Prussian pianist and composer active in the early 19th century.

Life
Mayer was born in Königsberg. His father was a clarinetist who, soon after Charles's birth, moved to Saint Petersburg and four years later to Moscow. He received his early musical education from his mother, followed by extended studies with John Field (1782–1837), with whom he continued to study after the family returned to Saint Petersburg after the Moscow fire of 1812. His first successful tour as a concert pianist in 1814 led him to Poland, Germany, Holland, and France, before he settled in Saint Petersburg in 1819. During another celebrated concert tour of 1845 he travelled through Scandinavia (where he became an honorary member of the Royal College of Music in Stockholm), Germany (Hamburg, Leipzig) and Austria (Vienna). Following the rise of Adolf von Henselt in Saint Petersburg, Mayer withdrew to Dresden in 1846, and died there.

Mayer was a busy and successful teacher who is supposed to have taught some 800 pupils in Saint Petersburg. He was reputed to have taken over the calm and musical (rather than virtuoso) technique established by Field. His most prominent pupils included the Russian pianist and composer Mikhail Glinka and Polish composer Filipina Brzezinska-Szymanowska.

Music
Mayer wrote almost exclusively for the piano, producing more than 350 works for the instrument. His main body of work includes a number of studies, sets of variations on popular melodies, character pieces and dances.

He is sometimes confused with another composer by the same name who died in 1904. Mayer's Valse Mélancolique, subtitled Le Regret, Op. 332, was for more than a century misattributed to Frédéric Chopin, until its true authorship was confirmed by Italian music scholar Luca Chierici in 2012.

Selected works
Valse de concert op. 6
Premium concert polka op. 9
6 Exercises op. 31
Variations sur un air russe No. 1 op. 40
Variations sur un air russe No. 2 op. 41
Rondino op. 426 Études op. 553 Études op. 61Scherzo op. 63Impromptu No. 2 op. 65Valse-étude No. 4 op. 69Nocturne op. 81Valse-étude op. 83Caprice-Valse No. 1 op. 85Capriccio No. 3 op. 87Études op. 93Divertissement No. 1 op. 95Valse-étude No. 6 op. 116Galop militaire op. 1173 Études caractéristiques op. 127Souvenir de Naples op. 128Immortelles op. 14040 Études op. 168La Dernière rose. Fantaisie varié op. 1696 Novelletten op. 1796 Novelletten op. 183Romaneske op. 184Elisa polka op. 187Triolino-étude op. 190Mazurka graçieuse op. 224Chant bohémien op. 292Grande Étude d'octave op. 331Le Régret'' op. 332

References

External links

Charles Mayer "Le regret" Valse-Etude mélancolique op.332 from YouTube

1799 births
1862 deaths
19th-century classical composers
19th-century German composers
19th-century German pianists
Composers for piano
German male classical composers
Musicians from Königsberg
German Romantic composers
German male pianists
19th-century German male musicians